The 2022–23 Belgian Division 3 is the seventh season of the division in its current format, placed at the fifth-tier of football in Belgium.

Team changes

In
 Relegated from the 2021–22 Belgian Division 2 were Houtvenne, Wijgmaal, Couvin-Mariembourg, Givry and Durbuy.
 Promoted from the Belgian Provincial Leagues were:
 Champions for each of the provincial leagues: Wezel (Antwerp), Léopold (Brabant ACFF), Kampenhout (Brabant VV), Hoger Op Kalken (East Flanders), Monceau (Hainaut), La Calamine (Liège), Libramont (Luxembourg), Ciney (Namur), Wielsbeke (West-Flanders)
 In Limburg, Schoonbeek-Beverst took over the promotion spot of champions Achel, who did not ask for licence and were hence ineligible for promotion.
 Due to teams folding and/or voluntarily relegating at this and higher levels, extra spots opened up:
 Two extra teams were promoted from East-Flanders: Elene Grotenberge and Aalter.
 Two extra teams were promoted from West-Flanders: Roeselare-Daisel and Wervik.
 Winners of the interprovincial round on VV side: ASV Geel, Drongen and Rumbeke.
 Winners of the interprovincial round on ACFF side: Meix-dt-Virton.

Out
 Directly promoted into the Belgian Division 2 were 2021–22 Belgian Division 3 champions Oostkamp (VV A), Racing Mechelen (VV B), Union Namur (ACFF A) and Dison (ACFF B).
 Six teams also gained promotion following wins in the promotion play-offs: Lebbeke, Torhout, Erpe-Mere United, Lille, Turnhout and Binche.
 Relegated based on their finishing positions last season were
 Melsele, Sint-Niklaas and Rhode-De Hoek from division VV A,
 De Kempen, Berlaar-Heikant and Koersel from division VV B,
 Pont-à-Celles-Buzet and Stockel from division ACFF A, and
 Oppagne-Wéris, Wanze Bas-Oha and Gouvy from division ACFF B.
 Due to financial difficulties, Lochristi opted to drop down to the Belgian Provincial Leagues due to financial difficulties.

Belgian Division 3 VV A

Belgian Division 3 VV B

Belgian Division 3 ACFF A

Belgian Division 3 ACFF B

Number of teams by provinces

References

Belgian Third Amateur Division
Bel
5
Current association football seasons